Alaska was an unincorporated community in Fayette County, West Virginia.

The community was named after the Alaska Territory.

References 

Unincorporated communities in West Virginia
Unincorporated communities in Fayette County, West Virginia
Coal towns in West Virginia